Ben Carlson is a Canadian actor. Primarily associated with stage roles at the Stratford Festival, he won a Canadian Screen Award for Best Actor in a Television Film or Miniseries for his performance as Petruchio in the CBC Presents the Stratford Festival adaptation of The Taming of the Shrew.

Career 
Carlson was a Dora Mavor Moore Award nominee for Best Actor in a Play in 1995 for Hay Fever, and won a Jeff Award in 2007 for his performance as Hamlet at the Chicago Shakespeare Theatre. His other noted performances have included David Cameron in the Canadian production of The Audience, Walter Shirley in the 2008 miniseries Anne of Green Gables: A New Beginning and Wiley in the film My Dog Vincent.

Personal life 
He is the son of actors Leslie Carlson and Patricia Hamilton and is married to stage actress Deborah Hay.

Filmography

Film

Television

References

External links

20th-century Canadian male actors
21st-century Canadian male actors
Canadian male film actors
Place of birth missing (living people)
Year of birth missing (living people)
Canadian male television actors
Canadian male stage actors
Living people
Canadian male Shakespearean actors
Canadian Screen Award winners
Canadian people of American descent